Langøy Chapel is a parish church of the Church of Norway in Averøy Municipality in Møre og Romsdal county, Norway. It is located in the village of Langøy. It is an annex chapel for the Averøy parish which is part of the Ytre Nordmøre prosti (deanery) in the Diocese of Møre. The white, wooden chapel was built in a long church design in 1935.

See also
List of churches in Møre

References

Averøy
Churches in Møre og Romsdal
Long churches in Norway
Wooden churches in Norway
20th-century Church of Norway church buildings
Churches completed in 1935
1935 establishments in Norway